Crosswinds may refer to:

 The plural of crosswind, any wind that is blowing perpendicular to a line of travel

Art, entertainment, and media
Music
 Crosswinds (Billy Cobham album), 1974
 Crosswinds (Peabo Bryson album), 1978
 Crosswinds (Capercaillie album), 1987
Other art, entertainment, and media
 Crosswinds (film), a 1951 adventure film
 Crosswinds series, a book series written by various authors, e.g., Joan Hess
 Crosswinds.net, an early free webhost and webmail provider

Other uses
 Crosswinds East Metro Arts and Science School, an IB-certified middle school and high school serving nine districts in the state of Minnesota